CKAY-FM is a Canadian radio station that broadcasts a classic hits format at 91.7 FM, licensed to Gibsons, British Columbia with studios in Sechelt. The station targets Nanaimo and the Sunshine Coast.

Originally owned and operated by Westwave Broadcasting, the station was given approval by the CRTC on April 20, 2005.

CKAY previously had an adult contemporary format until June 2010, when the station switched to its current classic hits format. Although the signal is receivable in much of Greater Vancouver, the station does not target Vancouver, which is served only by CHLG-FM in terms of classic hits stations.

The station's transmitter is on Mount Benson, west of Nanaimo on Vancouver Island.

The station is currently owned by Vista Radio.

References

External links
91.7 Coast FM

Kay
Kay
Kay
Radio stations established in 2006
2006 establishments in British Columbia